Evinsville is an unincorporated community in Spartanburg County, in the U.S. state of South Carolina.

History
A post office called Evinsville was established in 1884, and remained in operation until 1906. Evinsville once contained a town store, a sawmill, and a cotton gin.

References

Unincorporated communities in Spartanburg County, South Carolina
Unincorporated communities in South Carolina